'Warming up' is a part of stretching and preparation for physical exertion or a performance by exercising or practicing gently beforehand, usually undertaken before a performance or practice. Athletes, singers, actors and others warm up before stressing their muscles. It is widely believed to prepare the muscles for vigorous actions and to prevent muscle cramps and injury due to overexertion.

Exercise

A warm-up generally consists of a gradual increase in intensity in physical activity (a "pulse raiser"), joint mobility exercise, and stretching, followed by the activity. For example, before running or playing an intensive sport, athletes might slowly jog to warm their muscles and increase their heart rate. It is important that warm-ups be specific to the activity, so that the muscles to be used are activated. The risks and benefits of combining stretching with warming up are disputable, although it is generally believed that warming up prepares the athlete both mentally and physically.

Stretching

Stretching is part of some warm-up routines, although a study in 2013 indicates that it weakens muscles in that situation. There are 3 types of stretches: ballistic, dynamic, and static:

 Ballistic Stretches involve bouncing or jerking. It is purported to help extending limbs during exercise, promoting agility and flexibility.
 Static Stretches involve flexing the muscles. This may help preventing injury and permit greater flexibility and agility. Note that static stretching for too long may weaken the muscles.
 Dynamic Stretching involves moving the body part in the desired way until reaching the full range of motion, to improve performance.

Warming up in other contexts
Psychologists, educators, singers, and similar professionals use warm-ups in therapeutic or learning sessions before starting or after a break; these warm-ups can include vocal and physical exercises, interactive and improvisational games, role plays, etc. A vocal warm-up can be especially important for actors and singers.

Benefits

Preventing injury 
There has been contradictory evidence in terms of benefits of comprehensive warm-ups for preventing injury in football (soccer) players, with some studies showing some benefit while other showing no benefit. It has been suggested that it is specifically warm ups aimed at increasing body temperature, rather than targeting stretching, which can prevent injury. Warming up before an eccentric exercise has been shown to reduce the severity of delayed onset muscle soreness (DOMS).

Increasing performance 
In baseball, warm-up swings using a standard weight bat are effective in increasing batting speed. In a 2010 meta-analysis, the authors concluded that in about four-fifths of the studies there was improvement in performance with various physical activities with warm-ups as opposed to without warm-ups. An increase in body temperature, specifically in the muscles, improves explosive skeletal muscle performance (e.g., jumping and sprinting).

See also
Cooling down
Sportswear

References

Physical exercise
Sports medicine